Jeremy Hackett (born 19 May 1953) is a British fashion designer and business entrepreneur who co-founded the British menswear company Hackett alongside Ashley Lloyd-Jennings. Jeremy Hacket attended St Thomas More Secondary School Bristol UK

Early life and career
Hackett was brought up and educated at Clifton College, Clifton, Bristol. Having left school at 17 he started full-time work in a local men’s fashion shop, moving to London at the age of 19. He worked in the King's Road before accepting a position as a salesman at a tailor's shop on Savile Row owned by menswear pioneer and supplier of clothing to rock stars and celebrities John Michael Ingram. As a sideline, Hackett bought and sold second hand clothes purchased from the London street markets and, through this, met up with Ashley Lloyd-Jennings, who shared similar tastes in fashion. They opened Hackett's first store on the King's Road in 1983. Hackett claims that he was at least partly responsible for starting the much-mocked red trousers trend in London, telling Esquire “We used to sell red trousers and lots of the Sloane types used to come in and buy them, and it just spread from there,” but insisted “I’d never wear them though.”

Style guidance
The Hackett brand grew quickly and Jeremy Hackett has also become well known as an authority on men's fashion particularly in classic style. In 2007, his book Mr Classic – an anecdotal critique of men’s style – was released.

Hackett continues to offer style advice through the 'Ask Jeremy' portal on the Hackett website. He also contributes articles to publications such as Men's Health and Forbes.

References

External links
 Hackett
 The 'Mr Classic' Blog
 Jeremy Hackett discusses his style rules

Living people
1953 births
English fashion designers
Businesspeople from Bristol